The Whitcomb Cabin is a historic  log cabin near Glenwood, Washington that was built in 1875.  Known also as the Stephen S. Whitcomb Cabin, it was listed on the National Register of Historic Places in 1975.  The listing included one contributing building and two contributing structures.

The cabin is the last surviving pioneer log cabin in the Lake Conboy area and one of few surviving in Klickitat.  It is the last building of the former community of Fulda, named for Mr. Whitcomb's home city, Fulda, in Germany.  The cabin served as the post office of Fulda.

References

Post office buildings on the National Register of Historic Places in Washington (state)
Houses completed in 1875
Houses in Klickitat County, Washington
Log cabins in the United States
National Register of Historic Places in Klickitat County, Washington
Houses on the National Register of Historic Places in Washington (state)
Log buildings and structures on the National Register of Historic Places in Washington (state)